The Victory Stakes is a Brisbane Racing Club Group 2 Weight for Age Thoroughbred horse race, for horses aged three years old and upwards, over a distance of 1200 metres at Eagle Farm Racecourse, during the Queensland Winter Racing Carnival. Total prizemoney is A$250,000.

History

The original race was named in honour of Sir Byrne Hart (1895–1989), who was a soldier, accountant, company director and served as chairman of the Queensland Turf Club (1966-74).

Name
1980–1982 - Sir Byrne Hart Handicap
1983 - The XXXX 
1984 - The XXXX Quality Hcp  
1985 - Crest International Cup   
1986 - Mayfair-Crest International Cup 
1987–1988 - Sir Byrne Hart Quality Handicap
1989–2009 - Sir Byrne Hart Stakes
2010 onwards - Victory Stakes

Distance
1980–1982 – 1810 metres
1983 – 1866 metres
1984–1985 – 2100 metres
1986–1987 – 2125 metres
1988 – 1830 metres
1989–2005 – 1400 metres
2006 onwards - 1200 metres

Grade
1980 -  Listed Race
1981–1991 -  Group 3
1992 onwards - Group 2

Venue
1980–2011 - Eagle Farm Racecourse
2013 - Doomben Racecourse
2014 - Eagle Farm Racecourse
2015 - Gold Coast Racecourse
2016 - Doomben Racecourse
2017 - Eagle Farm Racecourse
2018 - Doomben Racecourse

Past winners

 2022 - Count De Rupee     
 2021 - Niccanova     
 2020 - Victorem     
 2019 - I Am Excited     
 2018 - Impending     
 2017 - Music Magnate     
 2016 - Fell Swoop     
 2015 - Srikandi
 2014 - Temple Of Boom
 2013 - Buffering
 2012 - Meeting abandoned 
 2011 - Buffering
 2010 - Ghetto Blaster
 2009 - Swiss Ace
 2008 - Swiss Ace
 2007 - Mitanni
 2006 - All Bar One
 2005 - Wager
 2004 - Only Words
 2003 - Tit For Taat
 2002 - Mr Bureaucrat
 2001 - Make Mine Magic
 2000 - Cheiron
 1999 - Roulette
 1998 - Summer Beau
 1997 - Quick Flick
 1996 - Meeting abandoned 
 1995 - Pride Of Rancho
 1994 - Lets Hurry
 1993 - Chortle
 1992 - Majestic Boy
 1991 - Rough Habit
 1990 - Noble Clubs
 1989 - Groucho
 1988 - Finezza Belle
 1987 - Joindre
1986 - Handy Proverb
1985 - Noble Lad
1984 - Roipeka
1983 - Home Maid
1982 - Coe
1981 - Private Thoughts
1980 - Golden Rhapsody

See also
 List of Australian Group races
 Group races

References

Horse races in Australia